Elizabeth Hughes Meriwether (born October 11, 1981) is an American writer, producer and television showrunner. She is known for creating the Fox sitcom New Girl, and for writing the play Oliver Parker! (2010) and the romantic comedy film No Strings Attached (2011). She also created the ABC sitcoms Single Parents and Bless This Mess and the Hulu drama The Dropout.

Early life

Meriwether was born on October 11, 1981, in Miami, Florida. Her family moved from Miami to Detroit, Michigan, when she was five years old, and then to Ann Arbor, Michigan, when she was 10. Her father, Heath J. Meriwether, was the publisher of the newspaper Detroit Free Press, and her mother, Patricia Hughes Meriweather, was a painter.

Meriwether grew up aspiring to be an actress, but when she wrote her first play, she realized she wanted to be a playwright instead. Meriwether graduated from Greenhills High School in Ann Arbor. in 2000.

Education 
Meriwether graduated from Yale University in 2004. She double-majored in English and theater studies.

Career 
Meriwether wrote the plays Heddatron (2006), The Mistakes Madeline Made (2006) and Oliver Parker! (2010).

She held a showcase of her plays in Los Angeles, in which a young Emma Stone was cast. Meriwether has credited the showcase and Stone's participation as an important point in her career trajectory.

Upon moving to Los Angeles, Meriwether developed a play called Sluts. As part of a program to help aspiring playwrights adapt their scripts for television, she turned the idea into a television pilot. The pilot, described as "a raunchy, honest look at the messy dating lives of twentysomething women" was filmed for 20th Century Fox Television, but ultimately not picked up. However, it succeeded in establishing Meriwether as a distinctive comedic voice.

In 2010, she wrote an episode of Adult Swim's Childrens Hospital.

Meriwether wrote the 2011 romantic comedy film No Strings Attached, directed by Ivan Reitman and starring Natalie Portman and Ashton Kutcher. The film's working title was Fuckbuddies.

After her success with No Strings Attached, 20th Century Fox Television approached Meriwether about developing another television series. Meriwether pitched an idea about an "offbeat girl moving in with three single guys", inspired by her experience of "bouncing from Craigslist sublet to Craigslist sublet, for four years in L.A." when she was in her twenties.

The show, New Girl, was greenlit in 2011 with an initial order of 13 episodes and Zooey Deschanel in the title role. It aired 146 episodes over seven seasons. It was well received by critics and nominated for a number of awards, including five Golden Globe Awards and five Primetime Emmy Awards.

In 2013, she signed a multi-year overall deal with 20th Century Fox Television, to develop additional projects for the studio. Her deal was renewed in 2019.

Meriwether received put pilot commitment from ABC for the show Woman Up. She worked on the project with Zoe Lister-Jones, and Jason Winer.

The Fempire 
Meriwether is part of "The Fempire", a group of female screenwriters that includes Dana Fox, Diablo Cody and Lorene Scafaria. In 2012, the Fempire received the Athena Film Festival Award for Creativity and Sisterhood at Barnard College in New York City.

Meriwether is also a well-known feminist, who has done stand-up comedy, and performed for The Vagina Monologues in Las Vegas.

Filmography

Film

Television

References

External links

Elizabeth Meriwether at Playscripts, Inc.

1981 births
Living people
American women television producers
American television writers
Writers from Ann Arbor, Michigan
Writers from Detroit
Writers from Miami
Yale University alumni
American women dramatists and playwrights
American women screenwriters
American women television writers
Showrunners
21st-century American dramatists and playwrights
21st-century American women writers
Screenwriters from Florida
Screenwriters from Michigan
21st-century American screenwriters
Television producers from Michigan